Don Wai (เทศบาลตำบลดอนหวาย) is a subdistrict municipality (Thesaban Tambon), Non Sung District, Nakhon Ratchasima Province, Thailand. It became a municipality effective February 28, 2008. The TAO was created 1999, covers 20.49 km2, 7 villages and 3,440 citizen.

Thesaban of Nakhon Ratchasima Province